Attila was an American rock band, most notable for having featured a young Billy Joel as a member.

History
Joel was a member of a band called The Hassles; he and the drummer Jon Small broke away from the Hassles and formed Attila in 1969. The instrumentation was organ and drums, with Joel also handling the bass lines with a keyboard, similar to the Doors' Ray Manzarek. Their creative partnership ended in 1970 when Joel ran off with Small's wife, Elizabeth, whom he later married, although this did not end their collaborations, as Small produced Joel's Концерт video as well as the Live at Shea Stadium performance.

Attila album
Their only album, Attila, was released on July 27, 1970. Joel himself has gone on record as describing the album as "psychedelic bullshit".

Stephen Thomas Erlewine of AllMusic wrote, "Attila undoubtedly is the worst album released in the history of rock & roll — hell, the history of recorded music itself. There have been many bad ideas in rock, but none match the colossal stupidity of Attila."

Differently, a review on headheritage.co.uk ends on a positive note: "But it's just too over-the-top... the album cover, the vocals, the lyrics, it just ends up being an extremely entertaining joke that Billy wasn't in on. But I've gotta say, I dug his trip, and the record still puts me in a good mood every time."

One track from the album, "Amplifier Fire, Part 1 (Godzilla)," appears on Joel's 2005 boxed set, My Lives.

Track listing
Songs written by Billy Joel and Jon Small.

Side one
 "Wonder Woman" — 3:38
 "California Flash" — 3:34
 "Revenge Is Sweet" — 4:01
 "Amplifier Fire (Part I: Godzilla/Part II: March of the Huns)" — 7:40

Side two
 "Rollin' Home" — 4:55
 "Tear This Castle Down" — 5:49
 "Holy Moses" — 4:30
 "Brain Invasion" — 5:43

No singles were released from the album and it did not chart.

Production
 Produced By Irwin Mazur, Billy Joel and Jon Small.

Personnel
 Billy Joel (credited as William Joel) - vocals, keyboards, songwriter
 Jon Small - drums, songwriter
 Glenn Evans - road manager and creator of the direct input of a Hammond organ to Marshall amplifiers.

References

External links
 
 
 Review on Head Heritage by Boy Howdy
 AllMusic  [ link]

American progressive rock groups
Hard rock musical groups from New York (state)
Progressive rock musical groups from New York (state)
Psychedelic rock music groups from New York (state)
Rock music duos
Musical groups established in 1969
Musical groups disestablished in 1970
Billy Joel
Epic Records artists